Sylvania Township may refer to the following places:

 Sylvania Township, Scott County, Missouri
 Sylvania Township, Lucas County, Ohio
 Sylvania Township, Potter County, Pennsylvania

See also

Sylvan Township (disambiguation)

Township name disambiguation pages